Kráľ (meaning king) is a Slovak surname that may refer to the following notable people:
Daniel Kráľ (born 1978), Czech mathematician and computer scientist
 Janko Kráľ (1822–1876), Slovak romantic poet
Miroslav Kráľ (born 1947), Slovak football player
Viktor Kráľ (born 1994), Slovak football forward

Slovak-language surnames